Elisabeth "Elze" Geurts (born 26 April 1995) is a Dutch artistic gymnast. She represented her country at the 2021 World Championships, as well as at the 2015, 2017 and 2019 Summer Universiade, and was named an alternate to the Dutch gymnastics team for the 2020 Summer Olympics.

Personal life
As of 2021, Geurts was studying medicine and philosophy at the University of Amsterdam.

Career
Geurts has had an unusual career trajectory for an elite gymnast, as she did not make the national team until her twenties. Although she was considered a top prospect as a child, she plateaued as an adolescent and was written off as too tall to be competitive. Her progress had also been hindered by two Achilles tendon ruptures.

Geurts represented the Netherlands at the 2015, 2017 and 2019 Summer Universiade. She qualified to the vault final at both the 2017 and 2019 Universiade, finishing eighth and sixth respectively.

In 2021, Geurts won the all-around at the 1st Dutch Olympic Trial, where she also picked up the gold on vault, silver on floor exercise and bronze on the uneven bars. She was named an alternate to the Dutch team for the postponed 2020 Summer Olympics after placing eighth in the all-around at the 2nd Olympic Trial.

Following the Tokyo Olympics, Geurts placed first on vault at the 1st Dutch Worlds Trial, and was selected to compete at the 2021 World Championships in Kitakyushu, Japan, making her World championship debut at the age of 26. In the qualification round of the World championships, Geurts qualified to the vault final in second place behind reigning Olympic vault champion Rebeca Andrade. She also placed thirteenth on floor exercise, and was the third reserve for the floor final. However, during the vault final, Geurts fell on her second vault and placed eighth with a total score of 13.349.

In February 2022, Geurts suffered a torn ACL in her right knee while training.

Selected competitive skills

Competitive history

References

External links

1995 births
Living people
Dutch female artistic gymnasts
People from Raalte
Competitors at the 2019 Summer Universiade
Competitors at the 2017 Summer Universiade
Competitors at the 2015 Summer Universiade
Sportspeople from Overijssel
21st-century Dutch women